The Tulu-Bohuai language is a West Manus language spoken by approximately 1400 people on central Manus Island and on Peli Island, Manus Province, Papua New Guinea.

References

External links 
 Audio recordings and written materials on the 'Pelipowai' variety are available through Kaipuleohone

Manus languages
Languages of Manus Province